The Dosrius Castle is a castle situated atop a hill, some 246 m above sea level, to the north of Dosrius, in Maresme. Now only ruins, it was first documented in 1114, and is a contemporary of other castles in the area, notably Burriac Castle. Until the beginning of the 15th century it belonged to the Priory of Saint Peter of Casseres.

Castles in Catalonia